The 2019–20 Swiss Challenge League (referred to as the Brack.ch Challenge League for sponsoring reasons) was the 17th season of the Swiss Challenge League, the second tier of competitive football in Switzerland, under its current name. The season started on 20 July 2019 and was scheduled to end on 20 May 2020. The league was on winter break between 15 December 2019 and 24 January 2020.

On 28 February Swiss Football League postponed all Super and Challenge League matches of matchdays 24, 25 and 26. Postponement came after the Swiss Federal Council banned all major events until 15 March due to the COVID-19 outbreak. On 13 March Super and Challenge League football was halted at least until the end of April. The league eventually resumed on 19 June. The last regular games were played on 2 August 2020.

Participating teams
A total of 10 teams participated in the league. 2018–19 Swiss Challenge League champions Servette FC were promoted to the 2019–20 Swiss Super League. They were replaced by Grasshopper Club Zürich, who got relegated after finishing last-placed in the 2018–19 Swiss Super League. Rapperswil-Jona was relegated after finishing 10th. They were replaced by FC Stade Lausanne-Ouchy, who won promotion from the 2018–19 Swiss Promotion League.

Stadia and locations

Personnel

League table

Results

First and Second Round

Third and Fourth Round

Promotion play-offs

References

External links
 
Soccerway

Swiss Challenge League
2019–20 in Swiss football
Swiss Challenge League seasons
Swiss Challenge League